Albert Salomon Anselm Freiherr von Rothschild (29 October 1844 – 11 February 1911)  was a banker in Austria-Hungary and a member of the Rothschild banking family of Austria. Businesses that he owned included Creditanstalt and the Northern Railway.

Personal life 
Born in Vienna, he was the youngest son of Anselm von Rothschild (1803–1874) and Charlotte von Rothschild (1807–1859). Known in the family as "Salbert," he was educated in Vienna and Brünn/Brno.

On his father's death in 1874, brothers Nathaniel and  Ferdinand inherited most of their parents real estate and art collection. However, the family business passed to Albert including the S M von Rothschild bank, the single largest shareholding in the Creditanstalt, and the shares in the Northern Railway. After two generations in Austria, communications between his family and the Rothschilds in England had diminished considerably but Albert wisely reinstated the regular exchange of vital information on current economic matters and politics in their respective countries.

In 1876, Albert von Rothschild married his second cousin Baroness Bettina Caroline de Rothschild (1858–1892) of Paris, France, daughter of Alphonse James de Rothschild.  They had seven children. Their firstborn was Georg von Rothschild (22 March 1877 - 10 January 1934). He never married and died in a private mental hospital. The youngest, Oskar von Rothschild (1888–1909), never married and at age 21 committed suicide. Georg and Oskar are buried in the Zentralfriedhof, Vienna.

Albert von Rothschild owned several large properties including the Palais Albert Rothschild at Prinz-Eugen-Straße 20-22, in the IV. district Wieden district of Vienna designed by the French architect Gabriel-Hippolyte Destailleur and built between 1876 and 1882.

In December 1887, Albert and his wife were given the right to be presented at Court, the first time such a privilege had been granted in Austria to Jews. Albert continued the family's involvement in the arts and with philanthropic projects. He was a chess patron who helped to finance the Vienna tournaments of 1873, 1882, 1898, 1903 (Gambit) and 1908. He was also President of the Vienna Chess Association 1872-1883 and a strong amateur player. He took a special interest in institutions that provided assistance to Jewish artists and musicians. Following his wife's death in 1892 at the age of thirty-four, in her memory Albert von Rothschild built the Bettina Frauenspital (Bettina Hospital for Women) and a Bettina Rothschild begonia was named for her. The Austrian astronomer Johann Palisa named the large Main belt asteroid he discovered in 1885 the 250 Bettina in her honor as a benefactor of the Vienna Observatory.

Albert was awarded the Iron Cross of Merit in 1893 for his role in Austro-Hungarian monetary reform.

When his unmarried and childless brother Nathaniel died in 1905, Albert inherited his Palais Nathaniel Rothschild at 14-16 Theresianumgasse in Vienna along with its large collection of art.

Albert Salomon von Rothschild died in Vienna on 11 February 1911 and was interred next to his wife and their six-year-old daughter Charlotte in the city's Zentralfriedhof. In recognition of Albert von Rothschild's years of financial support, the 719 Albert Amor asteroid was named in his memory by astronomer Johann Palisa.

See also 
 See the list of references at Rothschild banking family of Austria

External links

1844 births
1911 deaths
Albert Salomon
19th-century Austrian businesspeople
Austrian bankers
Austrian chess players
Jewish chess players
Austrian art collectors
Philanthropists from Vienna
Austro-Hungarian Jews
Burials at the Vienna Central Cemetery
Chess patrons
20th-century Austrian businesspeople
Game players from Vienna